Marek Sąsiadek (born 2 November 1978) is a Polish snowboarder. He competed in the men's halfpipe event at the 2002 Winter Olympics.

References

1978 births
Living people
Polish male snowboarders
Olympic snowboarders of Poland
Snowboarders at the 2002 Winter Olympics
People from Rybnik